Asin Thottumkal (born 26 October 1985), known mononymously as Asin, is a former Indian actress who appeared predominantly in Tamil, Hindi and Telugu films. She is a trained Bharatanatyam dancer. She has received three Filmfare Awards. She began her acting career in the South Indian film industry, but later shifted her focus to Bollywood. She speaks eight languages.

Making her acting debut at the age of 15 with Sathyan Anthikkad's Malayalam film Narendran Makan Jayakanthan Vaka (2001), Asin had her first commercial success with the Telugu film Amma Nanna O Tamila Ammayi in 2003, and won a Filmfare Best Telugu Actress Award for the film. M. Kumaran Son of Mahalakshmi (2004) was her debut in Tamil and a huge success. She received her Filmfare Best Tamil Actress Award for her most noted critically acclaimed performance in her third Tamil film, Ghajini (2005). She then played the lead female roles in many successful films, the most notable being the action films Sivakasi (2005), Varalaru (2006), Pokkiri (2007), Vel (2008) and Dasavathaaram (2008), hence establishing herself as the leading actress of Tamil cinema and was also honoured by the Tamil Nadu government with the Kalaimamani award for her excellence in the field of art and literature. In 2013, Asin was conferred with the Pride of South Indian Cinema award at SIIMA for her contribution to Tamil cinema.

In late 2008, Asin made her debut in the Bollywood film Ghajini (2008), opposite Aamir Khan, which was the first Bollywood film to have collected more than 1 billion in the domestic box office, subsequently collecting  worldwide. Asin won the Filmfare Best Female Debut Award and many accolades for Ghajini. 2011 marked the most successful phase of Asin's Bollywood career, as she starred in Anees Bazmee's romantic comedy Ready, in which she co-starred alongside Salman Khan. The film was a major hit at the box office, collecting  worldwide. In 2012, Asin first starred in Sajid Khan's multistarrer Housefull 2, which collected more than 1 billion. She then featured in Bol Bachchan and Khiladi 786, which were also commercially successful with both grossing over 1 billion.

Early life
Asin was born on  26 October 1985 at Kochi in the state Kerala in a Malayali Syro-Malabar Catholic family. Her father Joseph Thottumkal is an Ex-CBI officer and later managed several businesses. Her mother Seline Thottumkal, who moved from Kochi to Chennai and then to Mumbai to live with her daughter, is a surgeon. According to custom, Asin was to be named Mary, after her paternal grandmother. Asin's father however, named her Asin as the name had a beautiful meaning. Asin has quoted that her name means "pure and without blemish". She states that the 'A' in her name is from Sanskrit meaning "without", and "sin" from English.

She attended Naval Public School from LKG through X standard. She then attended St. Teresa's School in Kochi for her Kerala Higher Secondary Examination Board (Plus Two) Education. After that, she attended St. Teresa's College in Kochi, a college affiliated with MG University, where she graduated with a Bachelor of Arts degree in English Literature.

Career

Early work (2001–2004)

Asin's first assignment was an advertisement for BPL Mobile. She debuted in the Malayalam film Narendran Makan Jayakanthan Vaka in 2001, at the age of 15. After taking a year out to pursue her education, Asin returned with her breakthrough film as an actress, Amma Nanna O Tamila Ammayi opposite Ravi Teja, portraying a Tamil girl in her first Telugu language film, which subsequently fetched her the Telugu Filmfare Award for Best Actress. In the same year she won the Santosham Best Actress Award for her performance alongside Nagarjuna in her second Telugu film Shivamani. Her following two Telugu films Lakshmi Narasimha and Gharshana, both portrayed Asin as the love interest for police officers and both were successful ventures.

Asin's first Tamil language film was M. Kumaran Son of Mahalakshmi, in which she co-starred with Jayam Ravi. Asin reprised her role from her film Amma Nanna O Tamila Ammayi for the remake, which saw her portraying a Malayali girl instead of the Tamil girl in the original. The movie subsequently went on to super-hit in Tamil cinema during 2004, introducing Asin to Tamil film industry. After a brief return to Telugu films, to do Chakram, she appeared in Ullam Ketkumae. The film, initially launched in 2002, was supposed to be her debut as a lead heroine, is a college love story, directed by Jeeva, which was long-delayed but eventually became a successful venture at the box office, creating wider opportunities for her and the rest of the cast.

Tamil film breakthrough and stardom (2005–2007)
After the release of Ullam Ketkumae, Asin was cited as a leading heroine of the Tamil film industry after starring in blockbuster films such as Ghajini, Sivakasi, Varalaru and Pokkiri respectively. The film which provided the breakthrough for Asin was Ghajini. The film, co-starring Surya, directed by AR Murugadoss, earned her the Tamil Filmfare Award for Best Actress. Her role was that of a vivacious young model named Kalpana. Sify.com praised her portrayal as "magical", describing her character as a "lovable chatterbox", played with "sheer ability in the romantic interludes, the poignant and heartfelt scenes when she rescues minor girls from villains and her gory end are touching". On the following Diwali in 2005, Asin had two releases, Sivakasi and Majaa. Despite the latter becoming an average grosser, the former went on to be a successful venture at the box office.

The following year, her long-delayed venture Varalaru opposite Ajith Kumar also succeeded at the box office, and The Hindu said she "looks lustrous and sails through her role smoothly". Asin appeared in Pawan Kalyan's Annavaram, another successful venture, which was a remake of Thirupaachi. In January 2007, Asin appeared opposite Ajith Kumar and Vijay in two different films, Aalwar and Pokkiri, with the latter becoming a success, whilst Aalwar became a failure. Though Asin's role in Aalwar got mixed to positive reviews, her performance in Pokkiri was lauded by critics. Her final project of the year was opposite Surya, in Hari's Vel, which had a Diwali 2007 release, subsequently becoming her third successful film which released during the Diwali season in three years. Asin, who portrayed a TV anchor, was appreciated for her role in the film.

Hindi film debut (2008–2010)

Asin appeared in her first dual role in K. S. Ravikumar's Dasavathaaram opposite Kamal Haasan, who portrayed ten roles. The film had been under production since September 2006. Despite being overshadowed by Haasan's ten roles, Asin's portrayals in the film were praised as her "best-to-date", with one of her roles being that of a Vaishnavite in 12th century Tamil Nadu; whilst the other character was a Brahmin girl from Chidambaram, for which she won her first ITFA Best Actress Award. Dasavathaaram subsequently went on to become one of the blockbusters.

Since establishing herself as the leading actress in South India, Asin opted to move into Bollywood. Her first film Ghajini, opposite Aamir Khan, was the remake of her breakthrough film of the same name. Upon release, the film garnered positive reactions from critics and masses alike, with Asin being singled out for her "fabulous" portrayal. Noted critic Taran Adarsh described her Hindi debut as "fabulous" and that "to share the screen space with an actor of the stature of Aamir Khan and yet remain in your memory even after the show has ended is no cakewalk. She looks fresh and photogenic and acts her part brilliantly, giving Asin's performance a positive outlook."

Ghajini became the highest grossing Bollywood film of 2008 and the sixth highest-grossing Bollywood film of all time according to net collections. Asin later appeared in Vipul Shah's London Dreams, alongside Salman Khan and Ajay Devgn, in which she played a south Indian girl, Priya, who is emotional but strong willed and an ambitious dancer at the same time. The film received mixed reviews from critics.

Her first film of 2011 was Kaavalan, which released on 15 January 2011. The film was a critical and commercial success, with Behindwoods praising her performance in a review and her being awarded a SIIMA award for Best Actress.

Final work (2011–2015)

Her next movie with Salman Khan, Ready, was released on 3 June 2011 to mixed reviews. Critics praised the chemistry between Salman and Asin. Upon release, Ready became the second highest weekend grossing Bollywood film, after Dabangg and went on to become the fifth film in Bollywood history to cross the coveted  mark in the domestic market.

In 2012, she first appeared alongside Akshay Kumar in Sajid Khan's multistarrer comedy Housefull 2. Though it received a mixed critical reception, it was a major commercial success. Asin generally received favourable reviews for her performance, with Adarsh stating that "[a]mongst the female leads, Asin has the meatiest role and gives a decent account of herself."

On 6 July 2012, Rohit Shetty's Bol Bachchan, alongside Ajay Devgn and Abhishek Bachchan, released with mixed reviews with the critics praising the performances of Asin, Ajay Devgn, and Abhishek Bachchan.

Khiladi 786, in which she reunited with her Housefull 2 costar, Akshay Kumar, released on 7 December 2012 to mixed reviews, but was strong at the box office and eventually became a commercially successful venture.

Asin did not appear in any movie in 2013 or 2014. Her only movie release of 2015 was All Is Well, directed by Umesh Shukla and produced by Bhushan Kumar. In one interview, director Umesh Shukla stated that Asin would be seen in an "important dramatic role".

Other work

Humanitarian work
During the shoot of her film Ready in Sri Lanka, she was part of camps that were meant to help the Sri Lankan Tamil people who were affected by the Sri Lankan Civil War.

In an interview during the DNA I Can Women's Half Marathon in 2012, Asin, speaking about the importance of health and the necessity of education said:

Brand ambassador
Asin has been the brand ambassador for several companies and products, and has appeared in commercials for Avon, Mirinda, Colgate, Fairever, Tanishq, Big Bazaar, Parachute, Spinz talc, Lux, Amrutanjan Healthcare, and Clinic All Clear. Asin has been endorsing Mirinda soft drinks since 2004.

Personal life
Asin is a Catholic Christian belonging to the Syro-Malabar rite, and currently resides in Mumbai. She also owns an apartment in Marine Drive, Kochi and a farmhouse in Vagamon, Kerala. The actress is a polyglot. She can speak seven languages; being well-versed in Malayalam (her mother tongue), Tamil, Telugu, Sanskrit, English, Hindi and French. Asin also speaks a smattering of Italian and learnt basic Marathi for her movie Khiladi 786, in which she played a typical Marathi girl. In June 2013, it was reported in the Indian media that Asin was learning German during her free time. She began learning Spanish after visiting Spain in early 2014.

Asin married Micromax co-founder Rahul Sharma in January 2016 in a Christian wedding that was followed by a Hindu ceremony, and quit acting after marriage. Their first child, a daughter Arin, was born on 24 October 2017.

Filmography

Awards and nominations

See also

 List of Indian film actresses

References

External links

 
 

Actresses from Kochi
Living people
Actresses in Malayalam cinema
Actresses in Telugu cinema
Actresses in Hindi cinema
1985 births
Filmfare Awards winners
Filmfare Awards South winners
Actresses in Tamil cinema
Recipients of the Kalaimamani Award
21st-century Indian actresses
Indian film actresses
International Tamil Film Award winners
Screen Awards winners
International Indian Film Academy Awards winners
Actresses in Malayalam television
Indian television actresses
Syro-Malabar Catholics
St. Teresa's College alumni